A college town or university town is a community (often a separate town or city, but in some cases a town/city neighborhood or a district) that is dominated by its university population. The university may be large, or there may be several smaller institutions such as liberal arts colleges clustered, or the residential population may be small, but college towns in all cases are so dubbed because the presence of the educational institution(s) pervades economic and social life. Many local residents may be employed by the university—which may be the largest employer in the community—many businesses cater primarily to the university, and the student population may outnumber the local population.

Description

In Europe, a university town is generally characterised by having an ancient university. The economy of the city is closely related with the university activity and highly supported by the entire university structure, which may include university hospitals and clinics, printing houses, libraries, laboratories, business incubators, student rooms, dining halls, students' unions, student societies, and academic festivities. Moreover, the history of the city is often intertwined with that of the university. Many European university towns have not been merely important places of science and education, but also centres of political, cultural and social influence throughout the centuries. As an example of this, Paris also illustrates the course of educational history with the Sorbonne and the Grande école.

Besides a highly educated and largely transient population, a stereotypical college town often has many people in non-traditional lifestyles and subcultures and with a high tolerance for unconventionality in general, and has a very active musical or cultural scene. The majority of the population is usually politically liberal. Many have become centres of technological research and innovative startups. Universities with start-up centers can be large cities like Munich, but also small cities like Trieste.

Although the concept of a university town has developed since the European Middle Ages, equivalents already existed in earlier times and in non-European cultures. For example, in later Classical times the city of Athens – no longer having any political or military power, but renowned as the greatest center of learning in the Roman Empire – had many of the characteristics of a university town, and is sometimes called such by modern scholars.

Town–gown relations

As in the case of a company town, the large and transient university population may come into conflict with other townspeople. Students may come from outside the area, and perhaps subscribe to a different—sometimes radically different—culture. Most students are young people, whose living habits may be different from older people.

Economically, the high spending power of the university and of its students in aggregate may inflate the cost of living above that of the region. It is common for university employees to commute from surrounding areas, finding the cost of living in town too expensive.

"Studentification," in which a growing student population move in large numbers to traditionally non-student neighborhoods, may be perceived as a form of invasion or gentrification. It may be due to university enrollment expanding beyond the capacity of on-campus housing, inadequate zoning enforcement, and/or student culture. Neighborhood associations may work to limit conversion of family homes to student rentals, while some local residents may oppose the construction of large on-campus dormitories or expansion of fraternity and sorority houses, forcing a growing enrollment to seek housing in town. Moreover, a single-family home can be converted into several smaller rental units, or shared by a number of students whose combined resources exceed those of a typical single-family rental—a strong incentive for absentee landlords to cater to students.

In the US, educational institutions are often exempted from local taxes, so in the absence of a system for payments in lieu of taxes, the university population will disproportionately burden parts of the local public infrastructure, such as roads or law enforcement. Some analysts argue that students relieve the burden on other parts of the local public infrastructure, such as local primary and secondary schools, by far the most costly line item in most North American city and town budgets, by providing tax revenues through local sales tax and property tax paid by landlords. When a university expands its facilities, the potential loss of property tax revenue is thus a concern, in addition to local desire to preserve open space or historic neighborhoods.

As a result, local people may resent the university and its students. The students, in turn, may criticize the local residents' taking jobs at the university provided by student tuition and fees, and accepting the tax revenues (e.g. local sales tax, property tax on rented properties) that students generate, but resenting students' lifestyles. Some students refer to other inhabitants as "townies", a term with somewhat derogatory connotations.

This "town and gown" dichotomy notwithstanding, students and the outside community typically find a peaceful (even friendly) coexistence, with the town receiving significant economic and cultural benefits from the university, and the students often adapting to the culture of the town.

Settlement in college towns

While noise, traffic, and other quality of life issues have not been resolved, some advocates of New Urbanism have led the development of neighborhoods in college towns by specifically capitalizing on their proximity to university life. For instance, some universities have developed properties to allow faculty and staff members to walk to work, reducing demand for limited on-campus parking; Duke University's Trinity Heights development is a key example. In many cases, developers have built communities where access to the university (even if not directly adjacent) is promoted as an advantage.

Student housing is also an important component of college towns. In the United States most state universities have 50 percent or more of their enrolled students living off-campus. This trend, which began in the 1960s, originally meant the conversion of near campus single-family homes to student housing, creating "student ghettos."

Colleges and other developers began building purpose-built off-campus student housing areas in the 1970s in more college towns.  Beginning around 2000 in the United States, nationwide real estate investment trusts (REIT) and publicly traded corporations began developing student housing complexes.

Another notable development since the 1990s is the surge in popularity of retirees relocating to college towns. Retirees are attracted to these locations because of cultural and educational opportunities, college athletic events, good medical facilities (often at teaching hospitals affiliated with medical schools), a low cost of living, and often a pedestrian- or public transit-friendly development pattern. Several development companies now specialize in constructing retirement communities in college towns.  In some cases the communities have developed formal relationships with the local institution.

The demand for housing from students, faculty, staff, and retirees kept college town home prices stable during the housing market downturn that began in 2005.

See also
 List of college towns
 Student quarter
 Town and gown
 Company town

Notes

References
 Gumprecht, Blake. "The American College Town", The Geographical Review 93:1, January 2003.
 Gumprecht, Blake. "Fraternity Row, the Student Ghetto, and the Faculty Enclave: Characteristic Residential Districts in the American College Town", Journal of Urban History, 32:2, January 2006.
 Gumprecht, Blake. "Stadium Culture: College Athletics and the Making of Place in the American College Town", Southeastern Geographer 43:1, May 2003.
 Kemp, Roger L.  "Town & Gown Relations: A Handbook of Best Practices," McFarland and Company, Inc., Jefferson, North Carolina, USA, and London, England, UK (2013). .

Student culture
Types of towns